The 1971 Northern Illinois Huskies football team represented Northern Illinois University as an independent during the 1971 NCAA University Division football season. Led by first-year head coach Jerry Ippoliti, the Huskies compiled a record of 5–5–1. Northern Illinois played home games at Huskie Stadium in DeKalb, Illinois.

Schedule

References

Northern Illinois
Northern Illinois Huskies football seasons
Northern Illinois Huskies football